The EMD GP38-2 is an American four-axle diesel-electric locomotive built by General Motors, Electro-Motive Division. Part of the EMD Dash 2 line, the GP38-2 was an upgraded version of the earlier GP38. Power is provided by an EMD 645E 16-cylinder engine, which generates 2,000 horsepower (1.5 MW).

GP38-2W 

The GP38-2W is a Canadian variant of the GP38-2. It is easily distinguished by its wide-nose Canadian comfort cab.  51 of these locomotives were produced for the Canadian National Railway during 1973–1974.

Although a W is commonly suffixed to the name, it is actually an addition by enthusiasts to help specify the presence of a CN-spec comfort cab. No locomotives built using CN's design of comfort cab ever featured a W in their designation, as the presence of the cab did not mechanically alter the locomotive. This is reflected by the lack of the "W" in the model designation on the builders' plates of these units.

There are snow shields above the inertial-filter central air intakes behind the cab; the electrical boxes and equipment blower behind the cab also differ in detail from a standard GP38-2.  They are otherwise identical.

Original buyers 

1,799 examples of this locomotive model were built for American railroads and industrial concerns, 257 for Canadian railroads and industrials, 156 for Mexican railroads and industrials, and 1 export unit for the Saudi Railways Organization. A total of 31 GP38-2s were built with high-short-hoods containing steam generators for passenger service on Mexican railways. In addition, all 257 of Southern Railway's GP38-2s had Southern's "standard" high-short-hoods.

Rebuilds 
A number of higher horsepower 40 Series locomotives have been rebuilt into the equivalent of a GP38-2, by removal of the turbocharger and the substitution of twin Roots blowers.

CSX and Norfolk Southern have both started replacing cabs on the aging locomotives. NS still calls them GP38-2 while CSX calls them GP38-3.

Preservation 

A relatively small amount of GP38-2s are in preservation, with all being ex-Southern, and all operating on tourist lines.

 Colebrookdale Railroad #5128, built as a Southern subsidiary GSF locomotive, is in a patched NS scheme and is operating excursions on the line.
 Southern Railway #5000, the first GP38-2 ever built, is preserved in operating condition, and sometimes operates excursion trains at the Tennessee Valley Railroad Museum. It was traded from Progress Rail with Norfolk Southern #5033 in 2017.
 Tennessee Valley Railroad Museum #5044, built as a Southern subsidiary C of G locomotive, is in black with ‘TVRM’ logos and the front and rear end. It is expected to operate excursion trains on the Hiwassee River Railroad in the near future.
 Tennessee Valley Railroad Museum #5109, painted in the museum's black and red scheme with yellow striping, is preserved and is operating excursions on the Hiwassee River Railroad.

See also 
 List of GM-EMD locomotives
 List of GMD Locomotives

References 

 Thompson, David, EMD GP38-2 and GP38-2W Original Owners.
 The Family Lines Rail System: Condensed List of Locomotives. 1 February 1982.

Notes

External links 

 US Government test of GP38-2 with biodiesel
 CN GP38-2 family

GP38-2
GP38-2
B-B locomotives
Railway locomotives introduced in 1972
Freight locomotives
Standard gauge locomotives of the United States
Diesel-electric locomotives of Saudi Arabia
Diesel-electric locomotives of Canada
Standard gauge locomotives of Canada
Standard gauge locomotives of Mexico
Standard gauge locomotives of Saudi Arabia
Diesel-electric locomotives of Mexico
Diesel-electric locomotives of the United States

pl:EMD GP38